Burnhamia may refer to:

 834 Burnhamia, an asteroid
 Burnhamia, an extinct genus of devil rays